The 2009 Indian general election in Delhi, occurred for 7 seats in the state.

Results

List of elected MPs

Delhi
Indian general elections in Delhi
2000s in Delhi